A light pen is a computer input device in the form of a light-sensitive wand used in conjunction with a computer's cathode-ray tube (CRT) display.

It allows the user to point to displayed objects or draw on the screen in a similar way to a touchscreen but with greater positional accuracy.  A light pen can work with any CRT-based display, but its ability to be used with LCDs was unclear (though Toshiba and Hitachi displayed a similar idea at the "Display 2006" show in Japan).

A light pen detects changes in brightness of nearby screen pixels when scanned by cathode-ray tube electron beam and communicates the timing of this event to the computer. Since a CRT scans the entire screen one pixel at a time, the computer can keep track of the expected time of scanning various locations on screen by the beam and infer the pen's position from the latest time stamps.

History 

The first light pen, at this time still called "light gun", was created around 1951–1955 as part of the Whirlwind I project at MIT, where it was used to select discrete symbols on the screen, and later at the SAGE project, where it was used for tactical real-time-control of a radar-networked airspace.

One of the first more widely deployed uses was in the Situation Display consoles of the AN/FSQ-7 for military airspace surveillance. This is not very surprising, given its relationship with the Whirlwind projects. See Semi-Automatic Ground Environment for more details.

During the 1960s, light pens were common on graphics terminals such as the IBM 2250 and were also available for the IBM 3270 text-only terminal.

Light pen usage was expanded in the early 1980s to music workstations such as the Fairlight CMI and personal computers such as the BBC Micro. IBM PC compatible CGA, HGC and some EGA graphics cards also featured a connector compatible with a light pen, as did early Tandy 1000 computers, the Thomson MO5 computer family, the Amiga, Atari 8-bit, Commodore 8-bit, some MSX computers and Amstrad PCW home computers. For the MSX computers, Sanyo produced a light pen interface cartridge.

Because the user was required to hold their arm in front of the screen for long periods of time (potentially causing "gorilla arm") or to use a desk that tilts the monitor, the light pen fell out of use as a general-purpose input device.

See also
 CueCat
 Digital pen
 Light gun
 Pen computing
 Stylus (computing)

Notes

References

External links 

Computing input devices
History of human–computer interaction
Pointing devices